The Edgar W. Howe House is a historic house in Atchison, Kansas. It was built for a newspaper editor. It is listed on the National Register of Historic Places.

History
The house was built in 1882 for Edgar Watson Howe, the editor of the Atchison Daily Globe newspaper. Howe became known as "the best smalltown newspaper reporter in the nation." He died in 1937.

Architectural significance
The house was designed in the Renaissance architectural style. It has been listed on the National Register of Historic Places since March 16, 1972.

References

Houses on the National Register of Historic Places in Kansas
National Register of Historic Places in Atchison County, Kansas
Renaissance Revival architecture in Kansas
Houses completed in 1882